Konstantin Georgiev Shtarkelov (March 20, 1889 – April 29, 1961) was a Bulgarian painter. He was born in Sofia and died in Sofia.

Revealed the poetics of Bulgarian mountains: Mt Rila, Mt Vitosha, the Rhodope Mountains.

Represented in the collection by a landscape entitled Birch.

Book information 
Zhivotoopisanie by Konstantin Shturkelov

1889 births
1961 deaths
Bulgarian artists
Bulgarian realist painters
Bulgarian watercolor painters
20th-century Bulgarian painters
20th-century male artists
Male painters